The Violin Concerto, Op. 23, is a three-movement concertante composition for violin and orchestra written from 1945 to 1946 by the Swedish composer Dag Wirén. The piece premiered on 10 April 1947 in Gothenburg, Sweden, with Clarence Raybould conducting the Gothenburg Orchestral Society; the soloist was the Swedish violinist . The Violin Concerto is a rare example of Wirén—the idiom of whom was primarily neo-classical—embracing a "full-blooded" neo-romantic style; it is, with its "greater depth of expression, ... in the spirit of" Jean Sibelius. In a 1979 radio interview, Wirén characterized the Violin Concerto as one of the best pieces he had composed

Structure
The Violin Concerto is in three movements. They are as follows:

Instrumentation
The Violin Concerto is scored the following instruments:

Soloist: violin
Woodwinds: 2 flutes, 2 oboes, 2 clarinets (in ??), and 2 bassoons
Brass: 4 horns (in ??), 2 trumpets (in ??), 3 trombones, and tuba
Percussion: timpani + other percussion
Strings: violins, violas, cellos, double basses, and harp

 published the piece in 1948.

Recordings
The sortable table below lists commercially available recordings of the Violin Concerto:

Notes, references, and sources

 
 

Compositions by Dag Wirén
20th-century classical music
Classical music in Sweden
1946 compositions
Wirén